Bedwell may refer to:

People
Edward L. "Benny" Bedwell, suspect in the unsolved murder of the Grimes sisters
Edward Parker Bedwell (1834-1919), Staff Commander in the Royal Navy
Frederick Bedwell (1796–1853), Lieutenant Commander in the Royal Navy
H. Guy Bedwell, Horse trainer
Simon Bedwell (b. 1963), English Artist
Steve Bedwell, Australian comedian and comedy writer
Stephanie Bedwell-Grime, Canadian author
Thomas Bedwell, Storekeeper of the Ordnance 1589-1595
William Bedwell (1561–1632), English priest and scholar

Fictional characters
Matthew Bedwell, a character in Philip Pullman's novel The Ruby in the Smoke
Nicholas Bedwell, a character in Philip Pullman's novel The Ruby in the Smoke

Places
Australia
Bedwell Island, Western Australia

Canada
Bedwell Bay, British Columbia
Bedwell Harbour, British Columbia
Bedwell Harbour Water Aerodrome
The Bedwell island group, Northumberland Islands, named after Edward Parker Bedwell
Bedwell Sound, named after Edward Parker Bedwell, north of Meares Island, near Tofino, British Columbia
Bedwell River, originally named Oinimitis, and also known as the Bear River, named in association with Bedwell S

United Kingdom
Bedwell, Stevenage, Hertfordshire

United States
Bedwell Springs, Tennessee
Marion T. Bedwell School, Bernardsville, New Jersey

See also
Bidwell (disambiguation)
Bidwill (disambiguation)